Nardone is a surname of Italian (typical of Lazio) origin. Notable people with the surname include:

 Benito Nardone (1906–1964), Uruguayan journalist and political figure
 George Nardone (born 1964), American politician
 Giorgio Nardone (born 1958), Italian psychologist and psychotherapist
 Gilda E. Nardone, American women's employment advocate and nonprofit director
 Michael Nardone (born 1967), Scottish actor
 Olga C. Nardone (1921–2010), actress
 Peter Nardone (born 1965), Scottish countertenor, organist, choirmaster and composer

Other
 Inspector Nardone (Italian: Il commissario Nardone), Italian television miniseries
 Nardone v. United States, a 1939 U.S. Supreme Court case

Italian-language surnames